Esele Bakasu (born 13 March 1975) is a retired footballer from DR Congo.

Bakasu was a member of the DR Congo squad for the 1998, 2000 and 2002 Africa Cup of Nations.

External links

1975 births
Living people
Democratic Republic of the Congo footballers
Democratic Republic of the Congo expatriate footballers
Democratic Republic of the Congo international footballers
1998 African Cup of Nations players
2000 African Cup of Nations players
2002 African Cup of Nations players
AS Vita Club players
SC Paderborn 07 players
Cambridge United F.C. players
Expatriate footballers in England
Expatriate footballers in Germany
Democratic Republic of the Congo expatriate sportspeople in England
Democratic Republic of the Congo expatriate sportspeople in Germany
Association football defenders
21st-century Democratic Republic of the Congo people